Ngwathe Local Municipality is an administrative area in the Fezile Dabi District of the Free State in South Africa. "Ngwathe" is the Sesotho name for the Renoster River.

Main places
The 2001 census divided the municipality into the following main places:

Politics 

The municipal council consists of thirty-six members elected by mixed-member proportional representation. Eighteen councillors are elected by first-past-the-post voting in eighteen wards, while the remaining eighteen are chosen from party lists so that the total number of party representatives is proportional to the number of votes received. 

In the election of 1 November 2021 the African National Congress (ANC) won a reduced majority of twenty-one seats on the council.

The following table shows the results of the 2021 election.

References

External links
 

Local municipalities of the Fezile Dabi District Municipality